Christian Hutin (born 18 January 1961 in Lille, Nord) is a  French politician and member of the National Assembly of France. He represents the Nord department as the Member of Parliament for Nord's 13th constituency,  and is a member of the Citizen and Republican Movement.

Elected mayor of Saint-Pol-sur-Mer in 1995 as part of the Rassemblement pour la République, he joined the Mouvement des Citoyens in 1999. He supported Jean-Pierre Chevènement in the 2002 presidential election and joined the Pôle républicain.

Vice President of the Urban Community of Dunkirk, he became a regional councillor in Nord-Pas-de-Calais in 2004 before being elected a député from Nord in the 2007 legislative elections, the sole MRC representative in the National Assembly. 

On 9 December 2021, he announced he would not seek election in the 2022 French legislative election.

References

1961 births
Living people
Politicians from Lille
Mayors of places in Hauts-de-France
Rally for the Republic politicians
Citizen and Republican Movement politicians
Deputies of the 13th National Assembly of the French Fifth Republic
Deputies of the 14th National Assembly of the French Fifth Republic
Deputies of the 15th National Assembly of the French Fifth Republic
Members of Parliament for Nord